Fort Mitchel is an American Civil War fortification at 65 Skull Creek Drive in Hilton Head, South Carolina.

History
The fort was built in 1861 by Union Army forces as part of the defenses of a coaling station and ship maintenance facility at Seabrook Landing.  It was named for Brigadier General Ormsby M. Mitchel, and is a rare surviving example of a semi-permanent fortification built by the Union in the South Carolina Low Country.

The fort site was listed on the National Register of Historic Places in 2017.  Today, it is an historic site that is open to the public.

See also
National Register of Historic Places listings in Beaufort County, South Carolina

References

Buildings and structures in Beaufort County, South Carolina
South Carolina in the American Civil War
National Register of Historic Places in Beaufort County, South Carolina
Mitchel
Mitchel
American Civil War on the National Register of Historic Places